The 9 January 1917 Crown Council meeting, presided over by German Emperor Wilhelm II, decided on the resumption of unrestricted submarine warfare by the Imperial German Navy during the First World War. The policy had been proposed by the German military in 1916 but was opposed by the civilian government under Chancellor Theobald von Bethmann Hollweg who feared it would alienate neutral powers, including the United States.  

Bethmann Hollweg insisted that the final decision lay with Wilhelm, and the Crown Council meeting was held to discuss the matter. The military, led by head of the German Imperial Admiralty Staff Henning von Holtzendorff and chief of the German General Staff Paul von Hindenburg, advocated in favour of the policy. They argued that the increased volume of shipping that could be sunk under the policy would knock Britain out of the war and that any adverse reaction from the US would be moot. The policy was announced to the United States on 31 January 1917 and commenced the following day. Although sinkings initially increased, Britain's switch to a convoy system reduced the effectiveness of the policy. It was one of the reasons for the US declaration of war on Germany on 6 April 1917.

Background 

Germany, as part of the Central Powers, had been at war with Britain and the other Allies since 1914. Merchant shipping was vital to the Allied war effort, carrying material across the Atlantic to Britain and France. From 4 February 1915 Germany had implemented unrestricted submarine warfare, in which merchant vessels were liable to sinking by U-boats without warning. The campaign was abandoned on 1 September 1915 following American protests after the sinking of the liners Lusitania and Arabic, in which a number of US citizens were killed.

By 1916 there had been no major breakthrough in the war on land or sea and arguments were made by the military to resume unrestricted submarine warfare. This was opposed by the civilian government under Chancellor Theobald von Bethmann Hollweg, supported by Vice-chancellor Karl Helfferich and Foreign Secretary Gottlieb von Jagow, on the basis that it would turn the remaining neutral powers against Germany. In a meeting with military figures at Schloss Pleß, a palace in Silesia used by the German Emperor Wilhelm II, on 29 December Bethmann Hollweg and Helfferich again voiced the government's concerns over the policy but stated that the final decision must lie with Wilhelm. A meeting of the German Crown Council to discuss the matter was planned for 9 January 1917.

The crown council was a form of privy council advising the German emperor on matters of state. They were relatively rare in the pre-war era and sometimes were not held for years at a time. They were attended by the Emperor, royal princes, government ministers, senior generals and the heads of the Emperor's military and naval households. The Crown Council had met on 29 July 1914 to decide to escalate the July Crisis into war. It had been a Crown Council of 31 May 1915 that had ended the first phase of unrestricted submarine warfare, one at Potsdam on 21 December had decided on the Verdun Offensive and one in March 1916 had permitted U-boat commanders to attack Allied merchant vessels without warning, whilst sparing passenger liners and neutral vessels.

Meeting 

Senior figures in the German army and navy met on 8 January to confirm their agreement that they would seek to persuade Wilhelm to implement unrestricted submarine warfare the following day. On 9 January, before the Crown Council session, Bethmann Hollweg met with Paul von Hindenburg, chief of the German General Staff, and Erich Ludendorff, the first quartermaster general, the effective heads of the German military, to discuss the policy.  Bethmann Hollweg spoke with them for about an hour to make his argument that the policy should not be implemented but was unsuccessful in changing their minds.

The Crown Council began at 18.00 and was presided over by Wilhelm. It was attended by Bethmann Hollweg; Hindenburg; Ludendorff; the chief of the German Imperial Naval Cabinet, Georg Alexander von Müller; the head of the German Imperial Admiralty Staff, Henning von Holtzendorff; the Chief of the civil cabinet, ; and the chief of the military cabinet, Moriz von Lyncker. The group stood around a large table, upon which Wilhelm leaned.

Hindenburg and Holtzendorff spoke in favour of the policy. Bethmann Hollweg spoke against it stating that "we must reckon, however, on the entry of America into the war, her help will consist of the delivery of food to England, financial assistance, the supply of aeroplanes and a force of volunteers". To this Hindenburg retorted that  "we are already prepared to deal with that. The chances of the submarine operations are more favourable than they are likely to be again. We can and must begin them". He also considered his army could deal with any declaration of war by neutral Denmark or the Netherlands as a result of the policy and dismissed Bethmann Hollweg's suggestion that long-neutral Switzerland might join the war.  

Von Holtzendorff stated that his staff considered that the U-boats could sink up around 600,000 tons of Allied shipping a month if the policy was in place. He thought that this would "bring Britain to her knees within five months". The army and navy advice was that unrestricted submarine warfare would eliminate Britain from the war within 4-6 months, rendering any impact from the US joining the war moot. Wilhelm quoted from a newspaper article by a German industrialist that supported unrestricted submarine warfare.  

Wilhelm was generally sympathetic to Bethmann Hollweg, who was suffering from a cold, but at one point grew impatient, stating "by God, this man still has scruples".  Wilhelm declared that he was persuaded by the arguments in favour of unrestricted submarine warfare and that the policy would be adopted. He stated at the council that if the US declared war because of the policy then it would be "so much the better", though he noted that measures might be taken to avoid the sinking of American passenger liners under the policy. No such measures were implemented. Once Wilhelm had decided, Bethmann Hollweg stated that he was not in agreement but would no longer oppose the measures. Müller noted that Bethmann Hollweg's position was "not so much approval as an acceptance of the facts". When he retired to bed Bethmann Hollweg cautioned Müller that the decision might lead to Germany having to come to peace terms of an "exceedingly modest" level.

Müller, a close confidante of Wilhelm, later said that he thought the Kaiser had settled on adopting unrestricted submarine warfare the night before the council which he had spent reading a memorandum prepared by Holtzendorff. A factor in the decision is thought to have been the threatened resignation of Hindenburg and Ludendorff if the policy was not adopted. Bethmann Hollweg considered resigning over the Crown Council decision but determined to remain as a bastion against further demands from the military and in the hope of working to keep the US neutral.

Germany's ally, Austria-Hungary, was not informed of the decision to reintroduce unrestricted submarine warfare until 20 January when Holtzendorff and German foreign secretary Arthur Zimmermann met with Emperor Charles I and senior Austrian politicians in Vienna. In their own Crown Council meeting of 22 January the Austrians agreed to join the unrestricted warfare campaign; their support with submarines and naval bases was vital to the campaign in the Mediterranean. Many Austrian politicians considered that although framed as a request, the Germans left them with no real choice but to support the measure. The formal agreement was made between Wilhelm II and Charles I in Berlin on 26 January.

Later events 
After the council the German ambassador to Washington formally notified the US government on 31 January that unrestricted submarine warfare would be implemented in the waters adjacent to the British Isles, the sea within  of the Western French coast and all of the Mediterranean Sea bar Spanish coastal waters and a  lane provided for Greek shipping. All Allied or neutral vessels in these zones would be liable to be sunk by U-boats without warning. The reason given for the adoption of the policy was the rejection by the Allies of a peace proposal announced by Germany in December 1916, although it is doubtful that the German government seriously considered the Allies would take up the offer in the first place.

In response to the adoption of unrestricted submarine warfare the US broke off all diplomatic relations with Germany from 3 February. The zones were expanded over the following months eventually including the Barents Sea and most of the North Atlantic. The policy was one of the factors that influenced the US government to declare war on Germany on 6 April. The policy increased the quantity of shipping sunk by U-boats to 500,000 tons in February 1916, 600,000 tons in March and 870,000 tons in April. This was a problem for the British, but their adoption of the convoy system reduced sinkings to a manageable amount. Bethmann Hollweg's opposition to unrestricted submarine warfare was one of the reasons for his dismissal as chancellor in July 1917. After this Germany moved towards a more militaristic government.

References 

January 1917 events
German Empire in World War I
1917 conferences
U-boat Campaign (World War I)
Privy councils